Hualpayunca (possibly from Quechua wallpa hen, yunka warm area on the slopes of the Andes) is an archaeological site in Peru. It is located in Obas District, region of Huánuco; above the village of Hualpayunca, at an elevation of ca. It is also home to a number of Condors who nest due to the high altitude. .

See also 
 Awkillu Waqra
Huichún

References 

Archaeological sites in Huánuco Region
Archaeological sites in Peru
Populated places in the Huánuco Region